Borgen is a Danish political drama television series. Adam Price is the co-writer and developer of the series, together with Jeppe Gjervig Gram and Tobias Lindholm. Borgen is produced by DR, the Danish public broadcaster, which previously produced The Killing. In Denmark, Borgen, is the informal name of Christiansborg Palace where all three branches of Danish government reside: the Parliament, the Prime Minister's Office, and the Supreme Court, and is often used as a stand in term for the Danish Parliament (Folketinget).

The programme tells how, against all the odds, Birgitte Nyborg Christensen (Sidse Babett Knudsen)—a minor centrist politician—becomes the first female prime minister of Denmark. Other main characters are Birgitte Hjort Sørensen as Katrine Fønsmark, a TV1 news anchor; Pilou Asbæk as Kasper Juul, a spin doctor; Søren Malling as Torben Friis, news editor for TV1; Mikael Birkkjær as Birgitte's husband, Phillip; and Benedikte Hansen as Hanne Holm, a journalist.

Four seasons, each comprising 8-10 episodes, have been made. The first season was broadcast in Denmark in the autumn of 2010, the second in the autumn of 2011, and the third beginning 1 January 2013. In the UK, BBC Four started broadcasting the first season on 7 January 2012, with a repeat-showing starting on 13 June 2012. The second season started on 5 January 2013, with initial overnight viewing figures of over one million for the first episode. The third season began on 16 November 2013, with two episodes being shown back-to-back. The fourth season was announced on 29 April 2020 as a partnership between Netflix and DR, and began airing on 13 February 2022. The fourth season was released as a separate series titled Borgen - Riget, Magten, og Æren (known internationally as Borgen – Power & Glory) on Netflix on 2 June 2022.

The series has been broadcast in most European countries, as well as in the United States, Canada, Mexico, South Korea, Japan, Israel, India, Australia, and New Zealand. The first three seasons were added to Netflix globally on 1 September 2020.

Birgitte Nyborg
Adam Price, the creator of the series, has stated, "I definitely want you to believe there is a shred of idealism in Birgitte Nyborg that is real. She's also become a very professional political being, but there is definitely that idealism, and that's important."

Sidse Babett Knudsen plays Nyborg. In describing her relationship with the character, she said, "They liked to see a woman feeling guilty and I didn't like that ... I think [Nyborg] should be responsible for her feelings. And when she has to make unsympathetic decisions, she should stand by them. I don't want her to feel sorry for herself or suddenly become a soppy mess in her private life, because you wouldn't believe her as a prime minister if she did that."

In the first episode, Birgitte is the leader of a minority political party, the "Moderates". However, as a result of a sequence of events following a closely fought general election, she finds herself a compromise candidate for the role of prime minister and remains in this position until the end of the second series. In the first series, she is known as Birgitte Nyborg Christensen. She divorces her husband Philip Christensen after signing the papers at the end of the first episode of series two and is then known as Birgitte Nyborg. In the elapsed time between the second and third series, Nyborg loses her position and becomes a businesswoman and public speaker, returning in the third series to form a new political party, the "New Democrats". The series ends with Nyborg taking up the position of the Danish foreign minister.

In the fourth season, titled Riget, Magten, og Æren (The Kingdom, the Power, and the Glory), Nyborg remains as foreign minister, having to navigate the implication of oil being found in Greenland that threatens to derail her party's green agenda, spark an international crisis with the US, China, and Russia, and push the government to the brink of collapse. The series ends with Nyborg resigned as leader of the New Democrats and foreign minister. It also hints that Nyborg will become the next President of the European Commission.

Cast

Political parties and media

While the political parties in the series are fictional, they may be recognisable as their real-life equivalents.
The Moderates (De Moderate), Birgitte Nyborg's centre-left party in the first two series, is based on the Danish Social Liberal Party (Radikale Venstre)
The centre-left Labour Party (Arbejderpartiet) is based on the Social Democrats (Socialdemokraterne)
The left-wing environmentalist Green Party (Miljøpartiet) is similar to the Socialist People's Party (Socialistisk Folkeparti)
The far-left Solidarity Collective (Solidarisk Samling) is similar to the Red-Green Alliance (Enhedslisten)
The New Democrats (Nye Demokrater), Birgitte Nyborg's new centrist party in the third season is based on the New Alliance (Ny Alliance)
The centre-right Liberal Party (De Liberale) is based on Venstre
New Right (Ny Højre) is similar to the conservative Conservative People's Party (Konservative Folkeparti)
The national-conservative Freedom Party (Frihedspartiet) is stated by party leader Svend Åge Saltum to be a successor party to Mogens Glistrup's Progress Party (Fremskridtspartiet), just like its real-life successor Danish People's Party (Dansk Folkeparti)

The fictional broadcasters and newspapers also have their real-life equivalents: the public broadcaster TV1 is based on DR1, the tabloid newspaper Ekspres is inspired by  Ekstra Bladet, and the commercial 2'eren is similar to TV 2.

Episodes

Reception
The series has been well received by critics and audiences alike. It became a hit in Denmark as well as the UK and the US (via Netflix), becoming one of several Danish series to do so in recent years. Maggie Brown of The Guardian cited the strong female characters, originality and an ability to "uncannily forecast actual developments in Danish politics" as reasons for its success. Jane Merrick of The Independent published a list of similarities from Series 2 to actual events in present-day UK politics following the conclusion of the series in the UK.

US critics have been similarly positive, with Newsweek dubbing Borgen "the best TV show you have never seen" and bestselling novelist and Entertainment Weekly columnist Stephen King put the series on the top of his top 10 list of the best TV shows of 2012. The New York Times also offered praise, describing Borgen as a "bleaker, Nordic version of  The West Wing" and saying it "finds a remarkable amount of drama and suspense in center-left alliances, pension plans, and televised debates."

With several middle of the road 3/6 star ratings, the Danish media's reaction to the third series was noticeably less positive than for the first two series. Politiken commented that the third series "ended like a soap opera" and "never succeeded in breaking free from predictability"; with Berlingske'''s review declaring that while the third series "tied up the loose ends in pretty bows and was, like the rest of the series, well performed, it was also insidiously dull". Tabloid paper BT however claimed that the series "finished on a peak" and with this third season had "become the best Danish series in years". The critique came after several months where storylines from the third series in an unprecedented manner for a Danish drama series had sparked media headlines and created hefty debates in real life Danish politics on, among other issues, prostitution and pig farming, epitomised by Danish MP Mai Henriksen from Conservative People's Party, who was widely accused by colleagues and journalists of advocating a bill of rights for prostitutes, solely because she was inspired by Borgen.

For the fourth season, the review aggregator website Rotten Tomatoes reported an approval rating of 100% based on 17 reviews, with an average rating of 9.5/10. The website's critics consensus reads, "Borgen returns after an extended hiatus with its emotional heft and political intelligence wholly intact, reasserting itself as the best kind of brainy escapism." Metacritic gave the series a weighted average score of 87 out of 100 based on 7 reviews, indicating "universal acclaim".

AwardsBorgen won the award for Best International TV series at the 2012 British Academy Television Awards.
Awards for the series include the 2010 Prix Italia for best drama series, a Golden Nymph to Sidse Babett Knudsen for Outstanding Actress in a drama series at the 2011 Monte-Carlo Television Festival, and the Fipa Grand Prize for Best TV Series as well as for Best Original Soundtrack at the 2011 Festival International de Programmes Audiovisuels.

Radio

DR1 produced a spinoff radio serial, Udenfor Borgen ("Outside the Castle"), to accompany the release of the television show.  The main character is Hans Gammelgard (voiced by Danish actor Finn Nielsen), private secretary in the Ministry of the Environment, who faces unexpected adversity after he tries to push for a controlled approach to the cultivation of genetically modified crops by Danish farmers.

Beginning in December 2013, BBC Radio 4 aired an English-language translation of the Danish radio serial, entitled Borgen: Outside the Castle, starring Tim Pigott-Smith as Hans Gammelgard. Reviewer Fiona Sturges of The Independent thought the radio version was "wholly pointless", and noted in particular that, unlike the television series, the radio program was "relegating its female characters to the fringes, casting them as secretaries and anxious mothers." On the other hand, Gillian Reynolds of The Telegraph gave the radio show a positive review, approving its complex treatment of the intricacies of the civil service. In 2015 Deutschlandfunk broadcast this radio serial with German explanations for some of the wordplays such as MOM=MON for Momentum=Monsanto.

Remake
In September 2011, it was announced that NBC would produce a US remake of Borgen, with a pilot being developed by David Hudgins and Jason Katims of Friday Night Lights fame. The NBC remake never materialized, but in November 2013 it was confirmed by Adam Price that HBO and BBC Worldwide were set to begin production on a U.S. remake of the series.

 Merchandise 

DVD
The first three series have been made available in Denmark and the UK on DVD. Both are coded Region 2 format and consist of the complete episodes as screened on DR1 and BBC4.

In the US, MHz Networks released all three series and the complete series box set on DVD coded Region 1.

Book

A novelisation of the first series of Borgen was released in Denmark, The Netherlands, and France on 19 February 2013. The Danish release from DR in conjunction with publisher Lindhardt & Ringhof is written by Jesper Malmose. Head of DR Sales Anders Kjærsgaard Sørensen hopes to have the book available in the UK soon.

Music

On 26 February 2013, DR Salg, the commercial distribution arm of DR, made Borgen (Original TV Series Soundtrack)'', nineteen tracks of Halfdan E's original compositions for the show, available for digital download on iTunes.

Based on the music from the show and entitled 'Borgen 2010', Halfdan E has also made a longer composition available through SoundCloud.

References

External links
 Ekspres  (Danish)
 
 
 

2010 Danish television series debuts
2010s Danish television series
2020s Danish television series
DR television dramas
Danish drama television series
Danish-language Netflix original programming
BAFTA winners (television series)
Peabody Award-winning television programs
Television series about journalism
Television series about television
Television series about prime ministers
Television shows set in Denmark